The Kentucky Retros was a professional basketball team based in Louisville, Kentucky that was scheduled to begin play in the American Basketball Association (ABA) in 2007. 

The team was originally located in Murray, Kentucky and named the Kentucky Colonels after the Louisville-based teams that had played in the ABA previously, but the name was changed in March 2007 in deference to the tradition of those teams. The original Kentucky Colonels were a part of the ABA from 1967 to 1976. On July 17, 1976, owner of the Colonels, John Y. Brown, Jr., agreed to a deal worth $3,000,000 that saw the end of the team just ahead of the 1976 ABA–NBA merger. 

Unlike their predecessors, the Retros did not stay around for a complete season. The team folded during the 2007–08 season.

2007–08 season 
Before the team was set to play in the 2007-08 ABA season, they played in basketball tournaments all around the United States. 

In June 2007, the team was set to participate in the 2007 Hoops Kentucky Pro Am. There is no record available to know how the team fared in the tournament.

Notable players 

 Marco Killingsworth - played college basketball 2001–2006; played for Auburn University in his freshman through junior seasons; after the 2004 season, transferred to Indiana University, where he averaged 17.1 points per game.

Logo 
The Retros' logo was designed by graphic design student DeWayne Esson while he was still a student at Murray State University. The colors were derived from those of the original Kentucky Colonels.

See also
 Sports in Louisville, Kentucky

References

2007 establishments in Kentucky
Defunct American Basketball Association (2000–present) teams
Basketball teams established in 2007
Basketball teams in Kentucky
Defunct sports teams in Louisville, Kentucky
Basketball teams disestablished in 2008
2008 disestablishments in Kentucky